Alina Troyano, more commonly known as Carmelita Tropicana, is a Cuban-American stage and film lesbian actress who lives and works in New York City.

Career
Tropicana burst on New York's downtown performing arts scene in the 1980s with her alter ego, the spitfire Carmelita Tropicana and her counterpart, the irresistible archetypal Latin macho Pingalito Betancourt. She also has performed as Hernando Cortes's horse and la Cucaracha Martina from her childhood fairy tales in Cuba.

In Tropicana's work, humor and fantasy become subversive tools to rewrite history. In 1999, she received an Obie Award for “sustained excellence in performance” El Diario La Prensa, a daily Spanish-language newspaper, named Tropicana "One of the Most Notable Women of 1998".

Tropicana is the sister of the independent film director Ela Troyano, who directed Carmelita Tropicana: Your Kunst Is Your Waffen. Their collaboration on this film won them an award for best short film at the Berlin Film Festival in 1994. Both also form part of the alternative arts scene in the East Village and Lower East Side. Tropicana started her career in the early 1980s performing at the WOW Café Theater (a woman's theater collective) and now performs extensively in spaces such as Performance Space 122 and Dixon Place. In 2010, Tropicana served as a co-hostess to Vaginal Davis' performance piece "Speaking from the Diaphragm" at Performance Space 122. Tropicana often collaborates with her sister and with other performers such as Marga Gomez.

Tropicana is the author of a collection of performance pieces and short essays called I, Carmelita Tropicana: Performing between Cultures that includes four performance scripts, a screenplay, and three essays. Some of her work was featured in tatiana de la tierra's magazine Esto no tine nombre, which gave voice to Latina lesbians all over the world and published the artistic pieces of Latina lesbians like Tropicana's.

Tropicana's performances plays and videos have been presented at venues such as the Institute of Contemporary Art in London, Hebbel am Ufer in Berlin, Centre de Cultura Contemporanea in Barcelona, the Berlin International Film Festival, the New Museum of Contemporary Art in New York, the Mark Taper Forum's Kirk Douglas Theater in Los Angeles, Center for LGBTQ Studies in New York, and El Museo del Barrio in New York. Her work has received funding support from the Independent Television Service, the Jerome Foundation, and the Rockefeller Suitcase Fund. Other projects include Schwanze-Beast, a collaboration with filmmakers Ela Troyano and Susanne Sachsse, and El Comandante, based on her father who fought in the Cuban Revolution.

Criticism and interviews

The performance art of Carmelita Tropicana has received considerable critical attention from scholars of queer latinidad and performance art, most notably José Esteban Muñoz  and Yvonne Yarbro-Bejarano. In his text, Disidentifications, Muñoz uses the work of Carmelita Tropicana to illustrate the ways "camp" and "choteo" function as distinct comedic modes of disidentification. Muños also analyzed her use of animals as stand-ins for humans in With What Ass Does the Cockroach Sit? in his essay Performing the Bestiary. Using animals as characters and their symbolism occurs in several other works as well. Her work has also been cited in: From Bananas to Buttocks: The Latina Body in Popular Film and Culture, Selenidad: Selena, Latinos, and the Performance of Memory, José, Can You See?: Latinos on and Off Broadway, Virtual Gender: Fantasies of Subjectivity and Embodiment.

Works
 Carmelita Tropicana: Your Kunst is Your Waffen. (Art is your weapon) (1994), Film. Cast: Carmelita Tropicana, Sophia Ramos, Annie Lobst, Livia Daza Paris. The film introduces Tropicana, a New York City Lower East Side performance artist, who is a political activist by day and nightclub entertainer by night. The film is a cultural dissection of stereotypes and blends different genres- the American musical, the Latino telenovela, with experimental film.The film has aired on PBS and presented in festivals including Europe, Latin America and Japan. Winner of the Berlin Film Festival Teddy Bear Award, Stolichnaya and Audience Award at the 18th International Gay and Lesbian Film Festival, San Francisco. 
 Milk of Amnesia (1994), written and performed by Carmelita Tropicana, directed by Ela Troyano. Performance premier: Performance Space 122. Proust ate a Madeleine cookie and his childhood memories came rushing back; Carmelita ate a pork sandwich and she fell into a CUMMA – a collective unconscious memory appropriation attack. Milk of Amnesia is a travelogue that blends the persona of Carmelita with the more personal voice of her creator, and juxtaposes the memories of a horse in colonial Havana with that of a pig in Havana's modern day Special Period. Milk of Amnesia has toured Nationally and Internationally with last presentation at Yale World Performance Project 2007. Milk of Amnesia has appeared in many anthologies including the award-winning Oh Solo Homo edited by Holly Hughes and David Roman.
 Single Wet Female (2002), written by Carmelita Tropicana & Marga Gomez, directed by David Schweizer. Starring:  Marga Gomez, Carmelita Tropicana, Murray Hill (on video). Presented at Performance Space 122,  Throws Like a Girl Festival, Austin (2005) National Queer Arts Festival, S.F. (2002), Nominated for GLAAD Award. Single Wet Female combines film-noir satire with goofball socio-sexual performance. It is a spoof of the film cult classic Single White Female. Marga Gomez plays Margaret, a high femme Caucasian in a blonde wig, and Carmelita is Cammy, the uber butch who awakens her desire for plantains and merengue. The play includes video with drag king Murray Hill in the role of the boyfriend.
 With What Ass Does the Cockroach Sit? (2004), written and performed by Carmelita Tropicana, directed by David Schweizer. Commissioned and produced by INTAR Theatre, 2004. Presented at the University of Michigan, Syracuse University (2006), Mark Taper Forum's New Theater for Now Festival at the Kirk Douglas Theatre and DePaul University (2005) and at the Black and Latino Theatre Festival at Northwestern University (2008). With What Ass Does the Cockroach Sit? is a monologue that uses the saga of Elian Gonzalez, a shipwrecked Cuban boy, as a springboard to discuss Cuban politics from within and outside the island. Inspired by a beloved Latino fairy tale Perez y Martina by Pura Belpre the piece is a story of survival narrated by Martina, a street smart Cuban cucaracha, and Catalina, an imperious parrot owned by a singer of the Nueva Vista Social Club.
 The Box/Meine Box (2008), written and performed by Carmelita Tropicana, designed and directed by Ela Troyano. Presented at Location One, New York (2008), Joe's Pub, New York (2009), Camp Anti Camp Festival, Hebbel am Uffer, Berlin 2012. Performance Art. A refrigerator box moves. Afro Cuban aphorisms in Spanish, English or German are given along with chocolate kisses and pet stories. It is a piece inspired by Nayland Blake's exhibition at Location One curated by Maura Reilly.
 Post Plastica (2012), written by Carmelita Tropicana and Ela Troyano, directed by Ela Troyano. Commissioned by Performance Space 122 presented at El Museo del Barrio. Cast (theatre): Carmelita Tropicana, Becca Blackwell, Erin Markey. Part live performance, part film, part diva, part botox, Post Plastica a glimpse into a future in which celebrity culture has pitched a battle between the primacy of virtual and artistic lives; in which revolutionaries keep secret bees underground; and in which a half-woman half-bear scientist battles the despotic ruling CEO.
Recycling Atlantis (2014), live exhibition at 80WSE in New York by Uzi Parnes, Carmelita Tropicana, and Ela Troyano. Celebrated artist Jack Smith.
Schwanze-Beast (2015), written by Carmelita Tropicana and Ela Troyano, with collaboration from Susanne Sachsse. Commissioned and presented by the Vermont Performance Lab. Includes performance, scientific lecture, and installation. It looks at a future and considers animals and their civil rights.
 Memories of the Revolution: The First Ten Years of the WOW Cafe (2016), with Holly Hughes (performance artist) and Jill Dolan.

Awards 
 Creative Capital award, 2016.
 Anonymous Was a Woman, 2005.
 Obie for Sustained Excellence in Performance, 1999.

References

External links
 
 I, Carmelita Tropicana
 Dorson, Melanie.  "Comedy is Your Weapon: Performance Artist Carmelita Tropicana's Oppositional Strategies"
http://carmelitatropicana.com/
Complete Works
Recycling Atlantis

American actresses
Cuban lesbian writers
Living people
Obie Award recipients
American writers of Cuban descent
Year of birth missing (living people)
American lesbian actresses
American lesbian writers
21st-century American LGBT people
21st-century American women writers